The Long Hot Summer is a 1985 American made-for-television romantic drama film starring Don Johnson. It is a remake of the 1958 film of the same name.

Plot
Drifter Ben Quick arrives in a small Mississippi town and Will Varner, a family patriarch, sees Ben as a better choice to inherit the family business than his only son Jody. Will tries to push Ben and his daughter Noel into marriage. Noel is initially reluctant to court Ben and Jody senses that Ben threatens his position.

Cast
Don Johnson as Ben Quick
Jason Robards as Will Varner
Judith Ivey as Noel Varner
Cybill Shepherd as Eula Varner
Ava Gardner as Minnie Littlejohn
William Russ as Jody Varner
Wings Hauser as Wilson Mahood
Alexandra Johnson as Agnes Stewart
Stephen Davies as Alan Stewart
Charlotte Stanton as Mrs. Stewart
Albert Hall as Armistead Howlett
William Forsythe as Isaac
James Gammon as Billy Quick
Rance Howard as Wilk

References

External links

1985 television films
1985 films
1985 romantic drama films
Remakes of American films
American television films
Films directed by Stuart Cooper
American romantic drama films
1980s English-language films
1980s American films